Knežević is a Serbian, Croatian, Montenegrin and Bosnian surname, derived from the title of knez. It may refer to:

 House of Knežević, Croatian noble family

Knežević is the eighth most frequent surname in Croatia.

The anglicized version of this name, are Knezevich, Knezevic, or Knesevich as typically seen in the United States. The Polish variant is Kniaziewicz.

Geographical distribution
As of 2014, 45.4% of all known bearers of the surname Knežević were residents of Serbia (frequency 1:385), 23.6% of Bosnia and Herzegovina (1:367), 21.6% of Croatia (1:479) and 8.8% of Montenegro (1:174).

In Serbia, the frequency of the surname was higher than average (1:385) in the following districts:
 1. Srem District (1:192)
 2. Zlatibor District (1:221)
 3. South Bačka District (1:223)
 4. West Bačka District (1:233)
 5. Central Banat District (1:252)
 6. Rasina District (1:261)
 7. Belgrade (1:294)
 8. North Banat District (1:298)
 9. Mačva District (1:306)
 10. South Banat District (1:350)

In Bosnia and Herzegovina, the frequency of the surname was higher than average (1:367) only in Republika Srpska (1:262).

In Croatia, the frequency of the surname was higher than average (1:479) in the following counties:
 1. Zadar County (1:172)
 2. Virovitica-Podravina County (1:188)
 3. Šibenik-Knin County (1:201)
 4. Brod-Posavina County (1:234)
 5. Požega-Slavonia County (1:252)
 6. Vukovar-Srijem County (1:259)
 7. Osijek-Baranja County (1:294)
 8. Lika-Senj County (1:324)
 9. Primorje-Gorski Kotar County (1:389)
 10. Sisak-Moslavina County (1:425)
 11. Bjelovar-Bilogora County (1:469)

Notable people
Dario Knežević, Croatian footballer
Duško Knežević, Montenegrin businessman
Goran Knežević, Serbian politician, former mayor of Zrenjanin 
Ivan Knežević, Montenegrin footballer 
Ivana Knežević, Miss Montenegro 2006
Josip Knežević, Croatian footballer
Nenad Knežević "Knez", Montenegrin singer
Milan Knežević, Montenegrin Serb politician
Milan Knežević, Serbian politician
Milena Knežević, Montenegrin handballer
Milorad Knežević, Serbian chess grandmaster
Srđa Knežević, Serbian footballer
Stevan Knežević, Serbian painter and sculptor
Stevan Knežević, graphic designer
Uroš Knežević, Serbian painter
Vinko Knežević (1755–1832), Austrian general of the Napoleonic Wars
Zlatko M. Knežević, Judge of the Constitutional Court of Bosnia and Herzegovina
Zoran Knežević, several people

References

Montenegrin surnames
Croatian surnames
Serbian surnames